Maximiliano Mirabet (born 14 January 1982) is an Argentine retired footballer. His last team was Italian amateur Melfi Calcio.

Mirabet began his professional football career with All Boys.

References

External links
 

1982 births
Living people
Argentine footballers
Argentine expatriate footballers
All Boys footballers
Santiago Morning footballers
Expatriate footballers in Chile
People from Rojas Partido
Association football defenders
Sportspeople from Buenos Aires Province